Ribes erectum is a species of plant in the currant family. It is native to the Andes in  Ecuador and Colombia.

Ribes erectum is a shrub or small tree up to 6 meters tall. Flowers are in elongated arrays of 16–30, each flower yellowish-green and cup-shaped. Fruits are green or yellow, nearly spherical.

References

erectum
Flora of Ecuador
Flora of Colombia
Plants described in 1998